Kiginsky District (Qıyğı rayonı; , Qıyğı rayonı) is an administrative and municipal district (raion), one of the fifty-four in the Republic of Bashkortostan, Russia. It is located in the northeast of the republic and borders with Mechetlinsky and Belokataysky Districts in the north, Chelyabinsk Oblast in the east and southeast, Salavatsky District in the south and southwest, and with Duvansky District in the west. Its administrative center is the rural locality (a selo) of Verkhniye Kigi. As of the 2010 Census, the total population of the district was 19,137, with the population of Verkhniye Kigi accounting for 34.7% of that number.

History
The district was established on August 20, 1930.

Administrative and municipal status
Within the framework of administrative divisions, Kiginsky District is one of the fifty-four in the Republic of Bashkortostan. The district is divided into nine selsoviets, comprising thirty-nine rural localities. As a municipal division, the district is incorporated as Kiginsky Municipal District. Its nine selsoviets are incorporated as nine rural settlements within the municipal district. The selo of Verkhniye Kigi serves as the administrative center of both the administrative and municipal district.

References

Notes

Sources

Districts of Bashkortostan
States and territories established in 1930
 
